Robert Cross (born 21 September 1990) is an English professional darts player who plays in Professional Darts Corporation (PDC) events. He became the 2018 PDC World Darts Champion following his victory over Phil Taylor. Cross won the World Championship on his debut, having turned professional just 11 months prior to the event.

BDO career

2015
In October 2015, Cross attempted to qualify for the 2016 BDO World Darts Championship, where he was knocked out in the last 64 by Tony Martin. He also competed in the 2015 World Masters, losing to Darius Labanauskas in the last 48.

PDC career

2016
Cross competed in the 2016 UK Open as an amateur Rileys qualifier; making it to the last 32 before falling to world number one Michael van Gerwen, who achieved a nine-dart finish in the process. Following this, he competed in the PDC Challenge Tour, winning three of the 16 events and ultimately topping the Order of Merit, consequently earning a Tour Card for the 2017 PDC Pro Tour.

2017
At the 2017 UK Open, Cross reached the fifth round before being knocked out by eventual winner Peter Wright. The following week, he won his first PDC title by defeating Mervyn King 6–5 in the final of the third Players Championship. His first year on the tour continued positively, winning the 12th event with a 6–5 victory over Ian White, who missed five darts for the title.
Cross then beat Peter Wright 6–2 in the 19th Players Championship in Dublin and quickly added his 4th Players Championship (PC21) with a 6–3 win against Adrian Lewis to move into the top 32 for the first time.

Cross reached the final of two events in the 2017 PDC European Tour, the German Darts Grand Prix and the European Darts Trophy, both times losing to Michael van Gerwen. He reached his first premier event final in October at the 2017 European Championship, again losing to van Gerwen.

2018
Cross made his World Championship debut in 2018 as the 20th seed, reaching the final against Phil Taylor following wins over Seigo Asada, Michael Smith (in which Cross survived two match darts), John Henderson, Dimitri Van den Bergh and Michael van Gerwen (in which Cross survived six match darts). In the final he defeated Taylor, who had previously announced that he would retire after the tournament, 7–2 in sets. He is the only player to have survived match darts in two different rounds and then go on to win the World title. Winning the World Championship meant that he finished at number 3 in the PDC Order of Merit and earned automatic qualification for the 2018 Premier League Darts.

Cross was tipped by a few pundits to have an off year as they thought that the pressure of being world champion would get to him, despite this he made a good showing on his Premier League debut making it to the semi finals.
However, he only won one players championship title in comparison to 2017 where he won 4, he won players championship 13 by defeating Peter Wright in the final and he won his first World Series event which was the Brisbane Darts Masters by defeating Micheal Van Gerwen 10–6 in the final. He had made two previous World Series finals that year : Las Vegas and Shanghai.

2019
In defence of his world title at the 2019 World Championship, Cross lost 4–2 in the fourth round to Luke Humphries.

Cross made his 3rd major final and 6th televised final at the 2019 UK Open in Minehead. Cross was eventual runner-up at the tournament, as he lost heavily to Nathan Aspinall.

Cross made his second televised final of the year (4th major, 7th televised) at the 2019 Premier League Darts. After finishing 2nd in the league format, Cross went to the O2 in London for the Play-Offs. He took on James Wade in the semi-final and was successful in victory. He then took on World Number One, Michael van Gerwen in the final. He eventually lost the tournament by 11–6.

He won the World Matchplay against Michael Smith by beating him 18–13 in legs. Cross became only the fourth player to ever win the World Championship and World Matchplay (previously achieved by Phil Taylor, Michael van Gerwen and Gary Anderson). On his way to the final he beat Chris Dobey, Krzysztof Ratajski, Stephen Bunting and Daryl Gurney, (from 15–9 down in the semi-finals).

Cross reached his 4th World Series Final at the 2019 Brisbane Darts Masters. He lost to winner Damon Heta in a last leg decider 8–7.

On 27 October 2019, Cross won his 3rd major PDC title, the European Championship, beating Gerwyn Price 11–6 in the final in Göttingen, Germany.

2020
Cross had a poor showing in the 2020 World Championship, losing to Kim Huybrechts 3–0 in the second round.

At the World Series of Darts Finals he beat Michael Smith and James Wade en route to the final, before eventually succumbing to Gerwyn Price.

2021
Cross suffered another early exit at the 2021 World Championship, losing to Dirk van Duijvenbode 3–2 in the second round.

Cross won his 4th PDC major at the 2021 European Darts Championship beating Michael van Gerwen in the final 11–8.

2022
At the 2022 World Championship, Cross started his campaign with a 3–1 win against Raymond van Barneveld. In the next round he beat Daryl Gurney in a last set decider, before eventually succumbing 4–3 to Gary Anderson in the fourth round.

Personal life
Cross spent the majority of his early life living in Edenbridge, Kent. He was an electrician before turning professional. His nickname, "Voltage", comes from his former profession.  .

World Championship results

PDC
 2018: Winner (beat Phil Taylor 7–2)
 2019: Fourth round (lost to Luke Humphries 2–4)
 2020: Second round (lost to Kim Huybrechts 0–3)
 2021: Second round (lost to Dirk van Duijvenbode 2–3)
 2022: Fourth round (lost to Gary Anderson 3–4)
 2023: Fourth round (lost to Chris Dobey 2–4)

Performance timeline 

PDC European Tour

Career finals

PDC major finals: 10 (4 titles, 6 runners-up)

PDC World Series finals: 4 (1 title, 3 runners-up)

PDC team finals: 1 (1 runner-up)

References

External links

Official website

1990 births
Living people
English darts players
Professional Darts Corporation current tour card holders
PDC world darts champions
People from Pembury
World Series of Darts winners
World Matchplay (darts) champions
European Championship (darts) champions
PDC World Cup of Darts English team